This is a table of UN/NA numbers (United Nations and North American numbers) exceptions of hazardous materials.

References

Hazardous materials
Lists of UN numbers